Francis Hassard Burkitt  (1822–1894) was an Irish Anglican priest in the nineteenth century. 

Burkitt was educated at Trinity College, Dublin. After curacies at Abbeyleix and Ballinasloe, he held incumbencies at Killinane and Cappoquin. He was a Prebendary of Kilmacduagh from 1862 to 1881; and Archdeacon of Clonfert from 1874 to 1882.

References

Alumni of Trinity College Dublin
1822 births
1894 deaths
Year of birth unknown
Archdeacons of Clonfert